The 2001–02 DFB-Pokal was the 59th season of the annual German football cup competition. 64 teams competed in the tournament of six rounds which began on 24 August 2001 and ended on 11 May 2002. In the final Schalke 04 defeated Bayer Leverkusen 4–2, defending their title from the previous season and thereby claiming their fourth title.

Matches

First round

Second round

Round of 16

Quarter-finals

Semi-finals

Final

References

External links
 Official site of the DFB 
 Kicker.de 

2001-02
2001–02 in German football cups